San Giusto a Balli is a village in Tuscany, central Italy, in the comune of Sovicille, province of Siena. At the time of the 2001 census its population was 27.

San Giusto a Balli is about 11 km from Siena and 2 km from Sovicille.

References 

Frazioni of Sovicille